PK3 may refer to: 

 PK3 (file extension) , a file extension in the id Tech 3 game engine
 PK3 Paris, a clothing brand made by French footballer Presnel Kimpembe
 "PK3" (song), an alternative name for the Hindi song Nanga Punga Dost in the 2014 Bollywood film PK

See also 
 PK-3 Plus (ISS experiment), a joint Russian-German laboratory
 PK-35 (disambiguation)
 PK (disambiguation)